Filipp Toluzakov (born January 10, 1989) is a Russian professional ice hockey player currently under contract with Metallurg Novokuznetsk of the Supreme Hockey League (VHL).

He originally played with HC Spartak Moscow in the Kontinental Hockey League during the 2010–11 KHL season.

References

External links 

1989 births
Living people
Avtomobilist Yekaterinburg players
Dinamo Riga players
Metallurg Novokuznetsk players
Russian ice hockey forwards
SKA Saint Petersburg players
HC Spartak Moscow players
Ice hockey people from Moscow
Traktor Chelyabinsk players